Palterndorf-Dobermannsdorf is a town in the district of Gänserndorf in the Austrian state of Lower Austria.

Geography
Palterndorf-Dobermannsdorf lies in the hills of the eastern Weinviertel on the historic Bernsteinstraße in the valley of the Zaya River. Only about 2.2 of the municipality is forested.

References

Cities and towns in Gänserndorf District